The Singularity is a 2012 documentary film about the technological singularity, produced and directed  by Doug Wolens.  The film has been called "a large-scale achievement in its documentation of futurist and counter-futurist ideas”.

Synopsis
Doug Wolens organized his interviews with the commentators (see list below) by this set of topics, related to the singularity. During each topic or subtopic several commentators provide their viewpoints, some with suggestions on how to get there, others with a skeptical opinion about when it will happen.

 Topic I. Artificial intelligence
 Subtopic: Intelligence explosion
 Subtopic: Machines That Think
 Subtopic: Conscious machines
 Topic II. Becoming machines 
 Subtopic: Neuroengineering
 Subtopic: Nanotechnology
 Topic III. Techno-utopia – 
 Subtopic: Getting Ready
 Subtopic: Is The Singularity Near?
 Subtopic: Regulating technology
 Topic IV. Post-human – Transcend

Commentators
In order of their appearance in the film:
 Ray Kurzweil – National Medal of Technology recipient, Inventor
 Ralph Merkle – Institute for Molecular  Manufacturing / Senior Research Fellow
 Brad Templeton – Electronic Frontier Foundation Director
 Jonas Lamis – Technology Entrepreneur, Founder and Chief Operating Officer at Rally
 Paul Saffo – Distinguished Visiting Scholar at Stanford University
 Eliezer Yudkowsky – Singularity Institute for Artificial Intelligence, Co-founder
 Peter Voss – Adaptive AI, Inc / Founder and CEO
 Ben Goertzel – Novamente LLC, Artificial Intelligence Development, Founder
 Chris Phoenix – Center for Responsible Nanotechnology Co-founder
 Peter Norvig – Google, Director of Research
 Alison Gopnik – Professor of Psychology and Philosophy at UC Berkeley
 David Chalmers – Centre for Consciousness, Director and Professor Philosophy
 Wolf Singer – Max Planck Institute for Brain Research, Director
 Christof Koch – California Institute of Technology, Professor of Cognitive and Behavioral Biology
 Christine Peterson – Foresight Nanotech Institute, President and Co-founder
 Andy Clark – University of Edinburgh, Professor  of Philosophy
 Barney Pell – Bing/Microsoft Chief Architect for local search
 Cynthia Breazeal – MIT Media Lab's Personal Robots Group, Director
 Bill McKibben – Scholar in Residence – Middlebury College
 Richard A. Clarke
 Matt Francis – UC Berkeley / Professor of Chemistry
 David D. Friedman – Economist / Professor of Law at Santa Clara University
 Leon Panetta – United States Secretary of Defense
 Aubrey de Grey
 Glenn Zorpette – Executive Editor of IEEE Spectrum

Music

American composer Christopher (“Chrizzy”) Lancaster scored the original soundtrack for the film.  The soundtrack was created by the processing of acoustic cello sound through real-time samplers, audio effects and filtering recording his cello and feedback.

Release
The Singularity had limited theatrical release beginning with the 1400 seat Castro Theatre in San Francisco in September 2013, along with screening at the Brattle Theatre in Cambridge MA, the Smith Rafael Film Center in Marin California, and The Santa Fe Center for Contemporary Arts. The film has also had screenings at Yale University, University of Edinburgh, Arizona State University, NASA, BIL, and others.  These screenings featured post-screening discussion with expert panels, and/or question and answer sessions with director Doug Wolens.

Doug Wolens has pursued an alternative self-distribution strategy for The Singularity, working directly with theatres, museums, educational institutions, as well as with the national and local press, to promote the screenings and iTunes December, 2012 digital release.

Reception
Stephen Cass of the IEEE Spectrum called it "a lively introduction" that does not cover new ground.  Geoff Pevere of The Globe and Mail wrote that the film, a "intense, idea-packed account" of the concept, casts McKibben as the most compelling speaker, as his arguments come across the most human, appealing not only to reason but also feeling.  Alex Knapp of Forbes wrote that it is "well done and provides a good overview", though he said he would have liked to have seen more criticism of the basic tenet of exponential technological growth.  The interviewees themselves also attracted commentary; Case asked why there were no non-white subjects, and Pevere described them as "neo-hippie, unkempt longhairs".

References

External links
 
 

2012 films
2012 documentary films
American documentary films
American independent films
Documentary films about computing
Documentary films about robots
Singularitarianism
Singularity theory
Transhumanism
2010s English-language films
2010s American films
2012 independent films
English-language documentary films